Johann Friedrich Gräfe (7 May 1711 – 5 or 8 February 1787) was a civil servant and an amateur composer, whose works are still known today.

He was born in Braunschweig and baptized on 7 May 1711 in Nauen. He was a Kammerrat, a member of the court of the Principality of Brunswick-Wolfenbüttel. He was quite recognized at the time as an amateur composer. The attribution of his works is not always considered certain. His daughter Louise Gräfe married the writer Johann Arnold Ebert.

Stage works
 Herkules auf dem Oeta (1782), Singspiel in one act; text by Benjamin Michaelis Michaelis. (also attributed to Anton Schweitzer and Joseph Aloys Schmittbaur)

Selected works
 Sammlung verschiedener und auserlesener Oden zu welchen von den berühmtesten Meistern in der Music eigene Melodeyen verfertigt worden. (1737, 1739, 1741, 1743) 4 works in 1 volume, Hildesheim: Olms 2008 (Dokumentation zur Geschichte des deutschen Liedes 13). 
 Oden und Schäfergedichte in die Musik. Leipzig: Breitkopf, 1744.
 Sonnet auf das von Ihrer Koenigl. Hoheit der Churprinzessin zu Sachsen selbst verfertigte, in Musik gesetzte und abgesungene Pastorell Il Trionfo della fedeltà : womit zugleich eine neue Art Noten zu drucken bekannt gemachet wird. Leipzig, 1755; Facsimile Leipzig: Breitkopf & Härtel, 1919.
 Funfzig Psalmen, geistliche Oden und Lieder / zur privat und öffentlichen Andacht in Melodien mit Instrumenten gebracht. Braunschweig: Fürstl. Waysenhaus. Buchhandlung; Leipzig: Breitkopf, 1760.

References

This article is based on the corresponding article in the German Wikipedia.

1711 births
1787 deaths
18th-century classical composers
German classical composers
German male classical composers
18th-century German composers
18th-century German male musicians